Patrick Carignan (born October 11, 1974) is a Canadian former professional ice hockey left winger.

Carignan played junior hockey in the Quebec Major Junior Hockey League for the Saint-Jean Lynx and Shawinigan Cataractes from 1991 to 1995. In the 1994–95, Carignan won the Jean Béliveau Trophy after scoring 137 points, including 100 assists, in 71 games. He was also named in the QMJHL's First All-Star Team and the CHL Third All-Star Team.

Carignan went on to play professionally in Europe, playing in Germany for Heilbronner EC of the 2nd Bundesliga and in France for Anglet Hormadi Élite and Diables Rouges de Briançon of the FFHG Division 1 and Boxers de Bordeaux of the Élite Ligue.

Awards and honours

Career statistics

References

External links

1974 births
Living people
Anglet Hormadi Élite players
Boxers de Bordeaux players
Canadian ice hockey left wingers
Diables Rouges de Briançon players
Heilbronner EC players
Ice hockey people from Quebec
Saint-Jean Lynx players
Shawinigan Cataractes players
Sportspeople from Shawinigan